Crimson Hill is a prominent, ice-free hill,  high, on the south side of Pendulum Cove, Deception Island, in the South Shetland Islands. It was so named in 1829 by the British expedition under Foster, because there was a prominent stratum of brickstone in the hill.

See also
 Crimson Hill Tunnel, Somerset, England.  A tunnel on the disused Chard Canal

References
 

Hills of the South Shetland Islands
Geography of Deception Island